The Mercedes-Benz C111 was a series of experimental automobiles produced by Mercedes-Benz in the 1960s and 1970s.  The company was experimenting with new engine technologies, including Wankel engines, diesel engines, and turbochargers, and used the basic C111 platform as a testbed. Other experimental features included multi-link rear suspension, gull-wing doors and a luxurious interior with leather trim and air conditioning.

History
The first version of the C111 was completed in 1969. The car used a fiberglass body shell and with a mid-mounted three-rotor direct fuel injected Wankel engine (code named M950F). The next C111 appeared in 1970. It used a four-rotor engine producing 257 kW (350 hp).

The company decided not to adopt the Wankel engine and turned to diesel experiments for the second and third C111s. The C111-IID produced  and was based on the 240D W115 model OM616 engine. With more aerodynamic bodywork that gave it an air drag coefficient of 0.191, the C111 eventually reached  at the Nardò Ring in 1978, and averaged 16.0 liters/100 km at 316 km/h (14.7 mpg at 195.4 mph) over a 12-hour cruise. A later  4.8 L twin KKK-turbocharged V8 version set another record, with an average lap-speed of 403.78 km/h (250.958 mph). This was achieved by Hans Liebold in 1 minute, 56.67 seconds on May 5, 1979.

Total production was 16 cars: 13 first and second generation Wankel engined cars, two diesel engined third generation cars used in the Nardò record attempt, and a single V8 engined fourth generation car.

Mercedes-Benz introduced the C112 at the Frankfurt Motor Show in 1991 as a proposed production sports car.  The car used a mid-mounted 6.0 L V12 engine. After accepting 700 deposits, the company decided not to proceed with production.

References

Notes

Bibliography

External links 
Mercedes-Benz C 111
eMercedesBenz Feature:  A Look Back At The Mercedes-Benz C 111 Research Vehicle July 31, 2008
Some information (in french) and pictures of all C111 versions

C111
Cars powered by Wankel engines
Automobiles with gull-wing doors
Sports cars